Florian Hörnig (born 6 August 1986) is a German footballer who most recently played for 1. FC Köln II.

References

External links

Florian Hörnig at Kicker

1986 births
Living people
German footballers
Footballers from Munich
SpVgg Unterhaching players
SSV Jahn Regensburg players
Chemnitzer FC players
SC Fortuna Köln players
2. Bundesliga players
3. Liga players
Regionalliga players
Association football defenders
SpVgg Unterhaching II players